Yūichi Sugita was the defending champion but chose not to defend his title.

John Millman won the title after defeating Andrew Whittington 6–2, 6–2 in the final.

Seeds

Draw

Finals

Top half

Bottom half

References
Main Draw
Qualifying Draw

Men's Singles
Hua Hin Championships - Singles
 in Thai tennis